George Murdoch (1850–1910) was a Canadian politician and mayor of Calgary, Alberta.

George Murdoch may also refer to:

 George Murdoch (Lord Provost) (1715–1795), Lord Provost of Glasgow
 Tyrus (wrestler) (born 1973), the pseudonym of professional wrestler George Murdoch
 George Murdoch (murder victim) (1924/1925–1983), Scottish taxi driver and victim of the "Cheese Wire Murder"

See also
 George Murdock (1897–1985), American anthropologist
 George Murdock (actor) (1930–2012), American actor